The Tomb of the Unknown Soldier is a historic monument dedicated to deceased U.S. service members whose remains have not been identified. It is located in Arlington National Cemetery in Virginia, United States. The World War I "Unknown" is a recipient of the Medal of Honor, the Victoria Cross, and several other foreign nations' highest service awards. The U.S. Unknowns who were interred are also recipients of the Medal of Honor, presented by U.S. presidents who presided over their funerals. The monument has no officially designated name.

Tomb of 1921

On March 4, 1921, the United States Congress approved the burial of an unidentified American serviceman from World War I in the plaza of the new Memorial Amphitheater. On November 11, 1921, the unknown soldier brought back from France was interred below a three-level marble tomb. The bottom two levels are six granite sections each and the top at least nine blocks with a rectangular opening in the center of each level through which the unknown remains were placed through the tomb and into the ground below. A stone slab, rather than marble, covers the rectangular opening.

Tomb of 1931

Since 1921 the intent was to place a superstructure on top of the Tomb, but it was not until July 3, 1926, that Congress authorized the completion of the Tomb and the expenditure of $50,000 (with a completed cost of $48,000). A design competition was held and won by architect Lorimer Rich and sculptor Thomas Hudson Jones. An appropriation from Congress for the work was secured and on December 21, 1929, a contract for completion of the Tomb itself was entered into. The Tomb would consist of seven pieces of marble in four levels (cap, die, base and sub-base) of which the die is the largest block with the sculpting on all four sides.

Quarrying the Yule marble (3.9 miles south of Marble, Colorado by the Vermont Marble Company) was a one-year process beginning in 1930. The cap was quarried on the first attempt but the base required three tries. The large middle block also required three tries. In late January 1931, the 56-ton middle block was lifted out of the quarry. The quarrying involved 75 men. When the block was separated from the mountain inside the quarry it weighed 124 tons. A wire saw was then brought into the quarry to cut the block down to 56 tons.

On February 3, 1931, the block reached the marble mill site (in the town of Marble) after a four-day trip from the quarry. There it was crated, then shipped to Vermont on February 8. The block was sawed to final size in West Rutland, Vermont, and fabricated by craftsmen in Proctor, Vermont, before it was shipped by train to Arlington National Cemetery, Virginia. By September, all seven blocks were on the grounds of the Tomb site, at Arlington.

Assembly began in September 1931. An imperfection was found in the base, requiring three more quarryings. By the end of December 1931, the assembly was completed. Finishing work followed, with the carvings on the die block by the Piccirilli Brothers under the direction of sculptor Thomas Jones. (The brothers also carved the Lincoln statue for the Lincoln Memorial, among others). The Tomb was completed without formal ceremony on April 9, 1932.

The Tomb was placed at the head of the grave of the World War I Unknown. West of this grave are the crypts of Unknowns from World War II (south) and Korea (north). Between the two lies a crypt that once contained an Unknown from Vietnam (middle). His remains were positively identified in 1998 through DNA testing as First Lieutenant Michael Blassie, United States Air Force, and were removed. Those three graves are marked with white marble slabs flush with the plaza.

The Tomb has a flat-faced form and is relieved at the corners and along the sides by neo-classical pilasters set into the surface with objects and inscriptions carved into the sides. The 1931 symbolism of the objects on the north, south, and east sides changed over time.

 North and South panel with 3 wreaths on each side represent (in 1931) "a world of memories" but later the six major battles engaged in by American forces in France: Ardennes, Belleau Wood, Château-Thierry, Meuse-Argonne, Oisiu-Eiseu, and Somme. Each wreath has 38 leaves and 12 berries.

 East panel that faces Washington, DC, are three Greek figures representing Peace, Victory, and "American Manhood" – but later "Valor" instead of "American Manhood"

 West panel is inscribed with (centered on the panel):

 HERE RESTS IN
 HONORED GLORY
 AN AMERICAN
 SOLDIER
 KNOWN BUT TO GOD

Tomb Dimensions
as of 2004 (xxx)* 1931 die block dimension coming out of the quarry.

The Unknown of World War I

On Memorial Day, 1921, four unknown servicemen were exhumed from four World War I American cemeteries in France, Aisne-Maine, Meuse-Argonne, Somme, and St. Mihiel. U.S. Army Sgt. Edward F. Younger, who was wounded in combat, highly decorated for valor and received the Distinguished Service Cross, selected the Unknown of World War I from four identical caskets at the city hall in Châlons-en-Champagne, France, on October 24, 1921. Younger selected the World War I Unknown by placing a spray of white roses on one of the caskets. He chose the second casket from the right. The chosen Unknown was transported to the United States aboard . Those remaining were interred in the Meuse Argonne Cemetery, France.

The World War I Unknown lay in state in the Capitol Rotunda from his arrival in the United States until Armistice Day 1921. On November 11, 1921, President Warren G. Harding officiated at the interment ceremonies at the Memorial Amphitheater at Arlington National Cemetery. During the ceremony, the World War I Unknown was awarded the Victoria Cross by Admiral of the Fleet Lord Beatty, on behalf of King George V of the United Kingdom. The United Kingdom Victoria Cross was placed with the soldier. Other Allied nations also awarded the American Unknown Soldier with decorations, including the Legion of Honour, Médaille Militaire, and Croix de Guerre from France, the War Cross from Czechoslovakia, the Gold Medal for Bravery from Italy, the Virtuti Militari from Poland, and the Virtutea Militara from Romania.

Earlier, on October 17, 1921, the British Unknown Warrior had been conferred the U.S. Medal of Honor by General of the Armies John Pershing.

The Unknowns of World War II and Korea

On August 3, 1956, President Dwight D. Eisenhower (a general during WWII) signed a bill to select and pay tribute to the Unknowns of World War II and the Korean War. The selection ceremonies and the interment of these Unknowns took place in 1958. The World War II Unknown was selected from remains exhumed from cemeteries in Europe, Africa, Hawaii, and the Philippines.

Two Unknowns from World War II, one from the European Theater and one from the Pacific Theater, were placed in identical caskets and taken aboard  and placed on either side of the Korean unknown. Navy Hospital Corpsman 1st Class William R. Charette, then the U.S. Navy's only active-duty Medal of Honor recipient who was an enlisted man, selected the right-hand casket as the World War II Unknown. The casket of the remaining WWII unknown received a solemn burial at sea.

The Korean unknown had been selected from four unknown Americans who died in the Korean War that were disinterred from the National Cemetery of the Pacific in Hawaii. Army Master Sergeant Ned Lyle made the final selection. The unselected unknowns were re-interred there.

The caskets of the WWII & Korean unknowns arrived in Washington on May 28, 1958, where they lay in the Capitol Rotunda until the morning of May 30, when they were carried on caissons to Arlington National Cemetery. President Eisenhower awarded each the Medal of Honor, and the Unknowns of World War II and the Korean War were interred in the plaza beside their World War I comrade.

The Unknown of Vietnam

The Vietnam Unknown service member was originally designated by Medal of Honor recipient U.S. Marine Corps Sgt. Maj. Allan Jay Kellogg, Jr., during a ceremony at Pearl Harbor.

Each branch of the Armed Services took part in the transportation to honor the unknown. Marines from Marine Barracks Hawaii consisted of an Honor Guard of nine enlisted men and Lt. Denis Muller. The designated Vietnam Unknown was transported aboard , where the Marines stood guard over the casket during the voyage to Naval Air Station Alameda, California. At Travis, the debarkation ceremony turned the remains over to the USAF on May 24. The next day, the remains of the Unknown were flown from Travis Air Force Base, California, arriving at Andrews Air Force Base, Maryland. Once there the remains were turned over to the US Army, where the remains were taken to Fort McNair for placement upon the horse-drawn wagon which later carried the Unknown to the Capitol Rotunda for display before interment. While on display for public viewing, all branches of the U.S. Armed Forces stood in honor, guarding the casket of the Unknown for two weeks.

Many Vietnam veterans and President Ronald Reagan and Nancy Reagan visited the Vietnam Unknown in the U.S. Capitol. An Army caisson carried the Vietnam Unknown from the Capitol to the Memorial Amphitheater at Arlington National Cemetery on Memorial Day, May 28, 1984.

President Reagan presided over the funeral, and presented the Medal of Honor to the Vietnam Unknown, and also acted as next of kin by accepting the interment flag at the end of the ceremony. The interment flags of all Unknowns at the Tomb of the Unknowns are on view in the Memorial Display Room.

Identification of the Unknown
In 1994, Ted Sampley, a POW/MIA activist, determined that the remains of the Vietnam Unknown were likely those of Air Force 1st Lt. Michael Joseph Blassie, who was shot down near An Lộc, Vietnam, in 1972. Sampley published an article in his newsletter and contacted Blassie's family, who attempted to pursue the case with the Air Force's casualty office without result. In January 1998, CBS News broadcast a report based on Sampley's investigation which brought political pressure to support the identification of the remains. The body was exhumed on May 14, 1998. Based on mitochondrial DNA testing, Department of Defense scientists confirmed the remains were those of Blassie. The identification was announced on June 30, 1998, and on July 10, Blassie's remains arrived home to his family in St. Louis, Missouri; he was reinterred at Jefferson Barracks National Cemetery on July 11.

Redesignation of the crypt
The slab over the crypt that once held the remains of the Vietnam Unknown has since been replaced. The original inscription of "Vietnam" has been changed to "Honoring and Keeping Faith with America's Missing Servicemen 1958 – 1975" as a reminder of the commitment of the Armed Forces to the fullest possible accounting of missing service members. It was decided that the crypt would remain vacant.

Tomb Guards

The tomb guards are soldiers of the United States Army. The first military guards were troopers from the 3rd Cavalry, "Brave Rifles", who were posted nearby on Fort Myer. Since April 6, 1948, (known then as "Army Day"), when the regiment was reactivated, it has been guarded by soldiers from 3rd Infantry Regiment, "The Old Guard". The Old Guard is also posted to Fort Myer, Virginia, adjacent to Arlington National Cemetery. It is considered one of the highest honors to serve as a Sentinel at the Tomb of the Unknowns. Fewer than 20 percent of all volunteers are accepted for training and of those only a fraction pass training to become full-fledged Tomb Guards. The Tomb of the Unknown Soldier Guard Identification Badge is the third least-awarded qualification badge of the United States Army; as of July 4, 2020, they number 688, including 23 which have been revoked and 7 "administrative errors". It is preceded by the 15 Military Horseman Identification Badges and the 17 Astronaut Badges.

The soldier "walking the mat" does not wear rank insignia, so as not to outrank the Unknowns, whatever their ranks may have been. Non-commissioned officers (usually the Relief Commander and Assistant Relief Commanders), do wear insignia of their rank when changing the guard only. They have a separate uniform (without rank) that is worn when they actually guard the Unknowns or are "posted."

The sentinels will confront people who cross the barriers at the tomb or whom they perceive to be disrespectful or excessively loud; requesting all in attendance to remain silent and standing prior to the beginning of a guard change.

On November 9–10, 2021, in honor of the Tomb of the Unknown Soldier's centennial commemoration, members of the public were allowed to walk on the plaza and lay flowers for the first time since 1925. According to the Arlington National Cemetery's website, they "do not anticipate holding another event in our lifetimes in which the public will be able to approach the Tomb in this manner."

Weapons
There have been several different types of weapons used by the tomb guards. The changes in weapons reflect the changes in the Army, including the M1903 Springfield rifle, M1 Garand and M14 rifles, and the M1911, M9 and M17 pistols. Tomb guards currently carry M14 rifles, which are affixed to ceremonial rifle stocks.

Walking the mat
There is a meticulous routine that the guard follows when watching over the graves. The tomb guard:

 Marches 21 steps south down the  black mat laid across the Tomb.
 Turns and faces east, toward the Tomb, for 21 seconds.
 Turns and faces north, changes weapon to the outside shoulder, and waits 21 seconds.
 Marches 21 steps down the mat.
 Turns and faces east for 21 seconds.
 Turns and faces south, changes weapon to the outside shoulder, and waits 21 seconds.
 Repeats the routine until the soldier is relieved of duty at the Changing of the Guard.

After each turn, the guard executes a sharp "shoulder-arms" movement to place the weapon on the shoulder closest to the visitors to signify that the guard stands between the Tomb and any possible threat.

Out of respect for the interred, the sentinels command silence at the tombs. If the guard walking the mat must vocally confront a disturbance from spectators, or a threat, the routine is interrupted and remains so until the disturbance is under control. The sentinel will exit the mat, place the weapon in port arms position, and confront the disturbance. Once under control, the sentinel then walks on the pavement to the other side of the mat, turns to shoulder arms, and resumes the routine from the point of interruption.

Twenty-one was chosen because it symbolizes the highest military honor that can be bestowed—the 21-gun salute.

The mat is usually replaced twice per year: before Memorial Day and before Veterans Day. This is required because of the wear on the rubber mat by the special shoes worn by tomb guards. The sentinels have metal plates built into the soles and inner parts of their shoes to allow for a more rugged sole and to give the signature click of the heel during maneuvers. The sentinels wear sunglasses because of the bright reflection from the marble surrounding the Tomb and the Memorial Amphitheater.

Changing of the Guard

While Arlington National Cemetery is open, during the day in the summer months from April 1 to September 30, the guard is changed every half hour. During the winter months, from October 1 to March 31, the guard is changed every hour. After the cemetery closes to the public (7 p.m. to 8 a.m. April through September, and 5 p.m. to 8 a.m. October through March), the guard is changed every 2 hours. The ceremony can be witnessed by the public whenever Arlington National Cemetery is open.

The guard change is very symbolic but also conducted in accordance with Army regulations. The relief commander or assistant relief commander, along with the incoming guard, are both required for a guard change to take place. The relief commander orders the outgoing guard to "pass on your orders" to the incoming guard. The outgoing guard will say to the incoming guard, "Post and orders remain as directed." The incoming guard's response is always "Orders acknowledged." During changes when the public is witnessing the ceremony, the commander will inform the public that the ceremony is about to take place and that those in attendance should remain "silent and standing" throughout the entire event. In some occurrences, the public is also asked to refrain from taking flash pictures (mostly during inclement weather).

On October 4, 2021, the first all-female changing of the guard took place to honor Sergeant of the Guard Sgt. Chelsea Porterfield, who was the first woman to hold that position.

Dedication

A civilian guard was first posted at the Tomb on November 17, 1925, to prevent, among other things, families from picnicking on the flat marble slab with views of the city. A military guard was first posted on March 25, 1926. The first 24-hour guard was posted on midnight, July 2, 1937. The Tomb of the Unknowns has been guarded continuously, 24 hours a day, 7 days a week, since that time. Inclement weather, terrorist attacks, et cetera, have never caused the watch to cease.

Since 1948, the tomb guards, a special platoon within the 3rd U.S. Infantry Regiment (The Old Guard) work on a team rotation of 24 hours on, 24 hours off, for five days, taking the following four days off. A guard takes an average of six hours to prepare his uniform—heavy wool, regardless of the time of year—for the next day's work. In addition to preparing the uniform, guards also conduct physical training, tomb guard training, participate in field exercises, cut their hair before the next workday, and at times are involved in regimental functions as well. Tomb guards are required to memorize 35 pages of information about Arlington National Cemetery and the Tomb of the Unknown Soldier, including the locations of nearly 300 graves and who is buried in each one.

A special Army decoration, the Tomb of the Unknown Soldier Guard Identification Badge, is authorized for wear after passing a detailed test of 100 questions (from a pool of more than 300), a uniform test with two gigs (errors) or fewer (measured to the 1/64"), and a test on the guard-changing sequence. After serving honorably for a period of nine months, and having passed the sequence of tests, a tomb guard is permanently awarded the Badge. Since the first award on February 7, 1958, fewer than 650 soldiers have completed training and been awarded this badge, including four women. A small number of tomb guard Identification Badges have also been retroactively awarded to soldiers who served as Guards before 1959. The Tomb Guard Identification Badge is the only badge awarded by the United States Army that can be revoked after a soldier has left the military. The Regimental Commander of the 3rd U.S. Infantry Regiment has the authority to revoke a badge from any Guard (past or present) for any act that would bring discredit upon the Tomb of the Unknowns.

The badge was designed in 1956 and was first issued to members of the Honor Guard at the Tomb of the Unknowns on February 7, 1958. The badge was first issued only as a temporary wear item, meaning the soldiers could only wear the badge during their tenure as members of the honor guard. Upon leaving the duty, the badge was returned and reissued to incoming soldiers. In 1963, a regulation was enacted that allowed the badge to be worn as a permanent part of the military uniform, even after the soldier's completion of duty at the Tomb of the Unknowns.

In keeping with the dedication Tomb Guards have made, 2021 served as a centennial commemoration for The Tomb of the Unknown Soldier. Throughout 2021, the cemetery held events leading up to the centennial ceremony on November 11, 2021. The public was able to experience and participate in the commemorative events in many ways, both at the cemetery and virtually.

Damage and repair to the Tomb Monument

Cracking and weathering are causing concerns for the long-term preservation of the Tomb Monument. A November 1963 report first recorded horizontal cracking of the monument's marble die block. Though this was the first time that the damage was documented, the report made it clear that the cracks had become visible some time before that date.

In 1963–1964, there were two cracks—referred to as "primary" and "secondary"—extending approximately  around the die block. They grew another  over the next 15 years. Inspection has determined that the cracks have increased horizontally since 1990. Analysis also indicates that the cracks are not surficial  but extend partially through the block and will eventually extend all the way through.

The 1990 report documented deterioration of the marble's surface. The study projected that before 2010, the Tomb Monument will have been weathered enough to have a negative effect on the experience of the visitors and concludes the only solutions are to enclose or replace the monument.

Several options have been considered to deal with the damage. Officials at Arlington National Cemetery determined that proper repair can return the Tomb Monument to an acceptable appearance. However, because the cracks will continue to lengthen and widen, continuous grouting, regrouting, touch-up, monitoring, and maintenance would be required. Therefore, a report commissioned by Arlington National Cemetery and published in June 2006 confirmed the Cemetery's conclusion that "replacement of the three pieces of the Tomb Monument is the preferred alternative". A final decision was scheduled to be made on September 30, 2007.

The National Trust for Historic Preservation objects to the plan to replace the authentic Tomb Monument. The Trust expressed concern that Arlington National Cemetery seeks to replace the existing monument with marble from the original quarry, which experts agree is likely to eventually crack.

The Trust has observed that the Cemetery's own 1990 report recommended that the monument be repaired and that the Cemetery, in fact, commissioned Oehrlein Architects to repair the stone. In 2007, Mary Oehrlein informed Congressional staff members that: "The existing monument can easily be repaired, as was done 17 years ago, using conventional conservation methods to re-grout the cracks. Once repaired, the fault lines would be virtually invisible from the public viewing areas."

On September 26, 2007, U.S. Senator Daniel Akaka announced that an amendment crafted together with Senator Jim Webb will be added to the National Defense Authorization Act for Fiscal Year 2008 (H.R. 1585) that would require a report on the plans of the Secretary of the Army and the Secretary of Veterans Affairs to replace the monument at the Tomb of the Unknowns. The secretaries would be required to advise Congress on the current efforts to maintain and preserve the monument. Additionally, they would have to provide an assessment on the feasibility and advisability of repairing rather than replacing the Tomb Monument. Finally, if the secretaries choose replacement, they would have to report those plans and detail how they intend to dispose of the current monument. Once the report is provided, the secretaries are prevented from taking action to replace the monument for at least 180 days. The Akaka-Webb amendment was included in the bill by unanimous consent of the Senate. An amendment to the Fiscal Year 2008 Defense Authorization Bill authorized a review of the monument's condition. The bill also authorized repair, but not replacement, of the monument. Final passage of the National Defense Authorization Act for 2008 (H.R. 4986) was signed by President Bush on January 28, 2008.

In 2003 John Haines, a retired car dealer, offered to donate a large slab of marble to the Arlington National Cemetery to replace the existing marble. Haines paid $31,000 for the marble slab. The marble was not removed from the quarry, however, because imperfections were found and the block was rejected.

In June 2009 Arlington National Cemetery and the U.S. Army Corps of Engineers announced that the monument was to be repaired, not replaced. In 2010, the cracks were filled but the repairs lasted only a few months. In September 2011, the cracks were filled again and on October 21, 2011, inspection by the Corps of Engineers and other experts pronounced the repairs a success.

See also
 Civil War Unknowns Monument
 Tomb of the Unknown Confederate Soldier
 Tomb of the Unknown Soldier – for a list of similar memorials in other countries
 Tomb of the Unknown Revolutionary War Soldier
 World War I memorials
 Canadian Tomb of the Unknown Soldier
 The Unknown Warrior – London, UK
 The Unknown Soldier – Paris, France
 Military rites

Notes

References

Further reading

External links

 Official U.S. Army Tomb Guard and Tomb of the Unknowns website
 Arlington Cemetery official site 
 Arlington Historical Society
 Arlington Convention and Visitors Service official website
 Snopes's article on the Tomb of the Unknowns
 Society of the Honor Guard – Tomb of the Unknown Soldier
 Video of the Changing of the Guard at the Tomb of the Unknowns, by Dover Lodge #489
 Video of a changing of the guard
 
 Historic film footage of November 11, 1921 interment ceremony for the World War I Unknown Soldier at the tomb of 1921
 The Unknowns – 2016 Documentary film
 

Arlington National Cemetery
 
Military monuments and memorials in the United States
Unknowns, Tomb of
American recipients of the Victoria Cross
American World War I recipients of the Victoria Cross
Monuments and memorials in Virginia
Marble sculptures in Virginia
1931 sculptures
Tombs of Unknown Soldiers
Tombs in the United States
1921 establishments in Virginia